Mpi  is a Loloish language of Thailand. The number of speakers is in decline. It is spoken in the following two villages in northern Thailand.

Ban Dong, Tambon Suan Khuean สวนเขื่อน, Mueang Phrae District, Phrae Province (autonym:  in Ban Dong)
Ban Sakoeng, Tambon Yot ยอด, Song Khwae District, Nan Province (autonym:  Ban Sakoeng)

Since the Mpi of Thailand migrated from Mengla, Xishuangbanna, Yunnan, China over 300 years ago, there could also possibly be Mpi speakers in China (Nahhas 2007).

Phonology
Mpi has six tones and two phonations in its vowels, modal voice and stiff voice:

References

Further reading

Nahhas, Ramzi W. (2007) Sociolinguistic Survey of Mpi in Thailand. SIL International
Sittichai, Sah-iam (1984). Phrases and clauses in the Mpi language at Ban Dong, Phrae Province. Bangkok: Mahidol University MA thesis.

Southern Loloish languages
Languages of Thailand